Jean-Charles Chebat,  (January 13, 1945 - 21 May 2019) was a Canadian marketing researcher. He held the ECSC Research Chair of Retailing at HEC Montréal.

Biography

Early life and education
Jean-Charles Chebat was born January 13, 1945, in Algiers, Algeria. He read at Ecole Supérieure de Commerce de Paris in marketing from 1965 to 1968, earned an MBA in marketing from Laval University in 1969 and a Ph.D. in sociology from the University of Montréal in 1976. His dissertation was titled "Family decision making processes and social classes: a systemic approach".

Career

Chebat was on the board of several top journals, such as Journal of Retailing, Journal of Business Research, and Journal of the Academy of Marketing Science. He was the Associate Editor of Perceptual and Motor Skills and Psychological Reports.

Marriage and children
Chebat was married to Claire Gélinas-Chebat, a professor of linguistics at the Université du Québec. The couple has three children: Daniel-Robert, Ph.D. in neuroscience, Associate Professor at Ariel University in Israel, Myriam, MA in social work  and Elise, MS in marketing.

Published works
Marketing Management co-edited with Stanley Shapiro (Harper & Row, 1974)
Strategie du Marketing: Concepts et Modeles with G. M. Henault, (PUQ, 1977)
Gestion des Services with Pierre Filiatrault and Jean Harvey (McGraw-Hill, 1999)
Comportement du Consommateur with Pierre Filiatrault, Michel Laroche, et al. (Gaetan-Morin, 2003)

He has published about 150 refereed journal articles (Journal of Retailing, Journal of Business Research, Environment & Behavior, Journal of Social Psychology), as many conference papers, and ten book chapters.

Awards
1991: Rousseau/IBM Award for best interdisciplinary researcher, ACFAS
1994: Stephen J. Shaw Award, Southern Marketing Conference; first non-American recipient of this award
1996: Fellow of the Royal Society of Canada
1997: Pierre-Laurin-Award for the Best Researcher of the Year at HEC
1997: Distinguished Scholar of the Society for Marketing Advances
2001: Fellow of the Japan Society for the Promotion of Science
2001: Fellow of the American Psychological Association
2003: Fellow of the Society for Marketing Advances
2003: Pierre-Laurin-Award for the Best Researcher of the Year at HEC
2004: Knight of the National Order of Quebec
2005: Sir John William Dawson Medal

References

External links
https://web.archive.org/web/20081212092828/http://www.hec.ca/en/profs/jean-charles.chebat.html

1945 births
Living people
Fellows of the Royal Society of Canada
Knights of the National Order of Quebec
Academic staff of HEC Montréal
Université de Montréal alumni
Université Laval alumni